Dudenhofen is a Verbandsgemeinde ("collective municipality") in the district Rhein-Pfalz-Kreis, in Rhineland-Palatinate, Germany. The seat of the Verbandsgemeinde is in Dudenhofen.

The Verbandsgemeinde Dudenhofen consists of the following Ortsgemeinden ("local municipalities"):

*seat of the Verbandsgemeinde

Verbandsgemeinde in Rhineland-Palatinate